Velizar Iliev (born March 9, 1966) is an American modern pentathlete. He competed in the men's individual event at the 2000 Summer Olympics.

References

1966 births
Living people
American male modern pentathletes
Olympic modern pentathletes of the United States
Modern pentathletes at the 2000 Summer Olympics
People from Vratsa
Modern pentathletes at the 1999 Pan American Games
Pan American Games medalists in modern pentathlon
Medalists at the 1999 Pan American Games
Pan American Games gold medalists for the United States
20th-century American people
21st-century American people